Fitzroy Hoyte (6 July 1940 – 10 September 2008) was a cyclist from Trinidad and Tobago. He competed in the sprint event at the 1964 Summer Olympics, participating in two of the heats.

References

External links
 

1940 births
2008 deaths
Trinidad and Tobago male cyclists
Olympic cyclists of Trinidad and Tobago
Cyclists at the 1964 Summer Olympics
Commonwealth Games competitors for Trinidad and Tobago
Cyclists at the 1966 British Empire and Commonwealth Games
20th-century Trinidad and Tobago people